Xestoleptura behrensii is a species of flower longhorn in the beetle family Cerambycidae.

References

Further reading

 
 

Lepturinae
Articles created by Qbugbot
Beetles described in 1873